Lahcen Zinoun (born in 1944) is a Moroccan choreographer, modern dancer and filmmaker. He is considered the most renowned contemporary Moroccan choreographer.

Biography 
Zinoun was born in 1944 in La Cité ouvrière Socica of Hay Mohammadi, Casablanca. His father was a Berber, who worked as a railroad worker. In 1958, Zinoun entered the Conservatory of Casablanca, where he eventually was initiated to modern dance. In 1964, he received a first prize in dance by the conservatory; but nevertheless, he was refused a scholarship to study dance abroad. When Zinoun's father found out that he was a student at the conservatory, he kicked him out of the family home. Afterwards, Zinoun went to Belgium because of his admiration of the dancer Maurice Béjart, with whom he eventually became a danseur étoile in the ballet of the Opéra royal de Wallonie. 

In 1973, he decided to return to Morocco to contribute to modern dance and give it more recognition in his home country, but was met with little recognition. His return was also meant to reconcile with his father, who invited him to a wedding, and he said of this experience, "I saw my father dancing and I understood that we were united again". In 1978, with his wife Michèle Barret, also a dancer, he founded a school and a dance troupe, titled "Le Ballet-Théâtre Zinoun". He further tried to create a national troupe of traditional Moroccan dance, but the project was rejected by King Hassan II. In an interview Zinoun said, "King Hassan II called me in order to tell me that in Morocco we don’t dance. Morocco was a country of men". After all of these obstacles, he turned to other artistic endeavors, including painting, as an emotional outlet. He started dancing again in 1991, and the same year, he founded a new dance school in Casablanca, where his wife and sons taught. In 2003, he was named director of the Marrakech Festival of Popular Arts.

Starting in 1982, Zinoun created the choreography for several international and Moroccan films, and from 2001 onwards, has directed his own short and feature films.

Filmography

Honours 

  Knight of the Order of Leopold, 11 September 2003

See also
 List of dancers

References

External links 

 

1944 births
People from Casablanca
Shilha people
Moroccan film directors
Moroccan choreographers
Moroccan dancers
20th-century dancers
21st-century dancers
Living people